The Bernstein–Vazirani algorithm, which solves the Bernstein–Vazirani problem,  is a quantum algorithm invented by Ethan Bernstein and Umesh Vazirani in 1992. It is a restricted version of the Deutsch–Jozsa algorithm  where instead of distinguishing between two different classes of functions, it tries to learn a string encoded in a function.  The Bernstein–Vazirani algorithm was designed to prove an oracle separation between complexity classes BQP and BPP.

Problem statement 

Algorithm 

Classically, the most efficient method to find the secret string is by evaluating the function  times with the input values  for all : 

 

In contrast to the classical solution which needs at least  queries of the function to find , only one query is needed using quantum computing. The quantum algorithm is as follows: 

Apply a Hadamard transform to the  qubit state  to get 

Next, apply the oracle  which transforms . ( denotes addition mod two.) This transforms the superposition into

To obtain , a measurement in the standard basis is performed on the qubits.

Graphically, the algorithm may be represented by the following diagram, where  denotes the Hadamard transform on  qubits:

 

 
So, measuring the output of the circuit in the computational basis yields the secret string .

See also
 Hidden Linear Function problem

References

Quantum algorithms

Quantum complexity theory 

Computational complexity theory